The 1986 South American Under-16 Football Championship was the 2nd edition of the South American Under-17 Football Championship, a football competition for the under-16 national teams in South America organized by CONMEBOL. It was held in Peru from 4 to 19 October 1986.

Bolivia were crowned champions, and together with Brazil and Ecuador, which were the top three teams of this tournament, qualified for the 1987 FIFA U-16 World Championship in Canada.

Teams

 (title holders)

 

 (hosts)

Squads

Venues
All games were played in Lima at the Estadio Nacional.

First stage
The top two teams in each group advanced to the final stage.

Tiebreakers
When teams finished level of points, the final rankings were determined according to:

 goal difference
 goals scored
 head-to-head result between tied teams (two teams only)
 drawing of lots

All times local, PET (UTC−5).

Group A

Group B

Final stage
When teams finished level of points, the final rankings were determined according to the same criteria as the first stage, taking into account only matches in the final stage.

Winners

Qualified teams for FIFA U-16 World Championship
The following three teams from CONMEBOL qualified for the 1987 FIFA U-16 World Championship.

References

1986
1986 South American Under-16 Championship
1986 in South American football
1986 in Peruvian football
1986 in youth association football